The Potomac Athletic Club Rugby Team (PAC Rugby) of Washington, D.C. was a rugby union club based in Washington, D.C. PAC was one of the founding members of the now-defunct Super League.  PAC Rugby won the USA Men's Division 1 National Championship in 1995. Multiple PAC Rugby players were selected to play for national, and regional representative sides. 

In the fall of 2014, the Potomac Athletic Club merged with the Maryland Exiles, forming the Potomac Exiles.

The Potomac Athletic Club's legacy continues through PAC Youth Rugby.

External links
club history at Potomac Exiles' site
Super League
USA Rugby

References

Rugby clubs established in 1988
Rugby union teams in Washington, D.C.
1988 establishments in Washington, D.C.